Anke Reschwam Schulze (born 8 December 1972) is a German cross-country skier who has competed since 1992. Competing in two Winter Olympics, she finished fifth in the 4 × 5 km relay at Nagano in 1998 and had her best individual finish of tenth in the sprint event at Salt Lake City in 2002.

Schulze's best finish at the FIS Nordic World Ski Championships was seventh in the 5 km + 10 km combined pursuit at Trondheim in 1997. Her best World Cup finish was eighth in a 10 km event in Japan in 1997.

Schulze earned four individual victories at lesser events up to 10 km from 1997 to 2004.

Cross-country skiing results
All results are sourced from the International Ski Federation (FIS).

Olympic Games

World Championships

a.  Cancelled due to extremely cold weather.

World Cup

Season standings

Team podiums

 2 podiums

References

Women's 4 x 5 km cross-country relay Olympic results: 1976-2002 

1972 births
Cross-country skiers at the 1998 Winter Olympics
Cross-country skiers at the 2002 Winter Olympics
German female cross-country skiers
Living people
Olympic cross-country skiers of Germany
People from Bautzen
Sportspeople from Saxony